Hromada is a basic unit of administrative division in Ukraine.

Hromada may refer to:
 Hromada (political party), a political party in Ukraine
 Hromada (secret society), a society of intelligence of Ukraine
 Hromada, a political magazine published by Mykhailo Drahomanov 1878–1882

See also
 Hramada, cognate term in Belarus
 Gromada, cognate term in Poland
 Gromada (disambiguation)